Meudon is a railway station in Meudon, a southwestern suburb of Paris, France. It is on the Paris–Brest railway. It is served by Transilien trains from Paris-Montparnasse to Rambouillet, Dreux and Mantes-la-Jolie.

External links

 

Railway stations in Hauts-de-Seine
Railway stations in France opened in 1840